Kalani Purcell (born 13 January 1995) is a New Zealand professional basketball player.

College
Purcell began her college career at Hutchinson Community College in Hutchinson, Kansas for the Blue Dragons. After two seasons with Hutchinson, Purcell became the most decorated player in Blue Dragons history, earning her a transfer to Brigham Young University in Provo, Utah for the Cougars. During her time at BYU, Purcell received several awards in the West Coast Conference of NCAA Division I.

Statistics 

|-
| style="text-align:left;"| 2013–14
| style="text-align:left;"| Hutchinson
| 36 || 5 || 26.3 || .522 || .421 || .593 || 10.3 || 3.7 || 3.6 || 1.4 || 3.2 || 13.7
|-
| style="text-align:left;"| 2014–15
| style="text-align:left;"| Hutchinson
| 34 || 34 || 31.0 || .561 || .174 || .733 || 11.9 || 5.1 || 3.5 || 1.2 || 3.0 || 18.1
|-
| style="text-align:left;"| 2015–16
| style="text-align:left;"| Brigham Young
| 33 || 33 || 35.6 || .451 || .237 || .678 || 12.6 || 4.7 || 2.0 || 0.7 || 4.3 || 12.0
|-
| style="text-align:left;"| 2016–17
| style="text-align:left;"| Brigham Young
| 32 || 32 || 36.8 || .469 || .286 || .622 || 10.5 || 4.9 || 2.2 || 1.3 || 4.9 || 12.7
|-
| style="text-align:center;" colspan="2"| Career
| 135 || 104 || 32.2 || .504 || .270 || .658 || 11.3 || 4.5 || 2.8 || 1.1 || 3.8 || 14.1

Career

WNBL
Purcell has signed a two-year deal with the Melbourne Boomers in the Women's National Basketball League. There, she will play alongside the likes of Liz Cambage and Jenna O'Hea, under coach Guy Molloy.

In June 2019, Purcell signed on for her third year with the Melbourne Boomers for the 2019–20 season.

National team

Youth level
Purcell made her international debut for the New Zealand under-17 team at the 2009 FIBA Oceania Under-16 Championship in Brisbane, Queensland, at just the age of 14.

Senior level
Purcell made her senior international debut with the Tall Ferns at the 2013 FIBA Oceania Championship. She has taken home the silver medal on two occasions. Purcell played for the Tall Ferns at the 2016 FIBA World Olympic Qualifying Tournament in Nantes, France. After losses to France and Cuba, New Zealand failed to qualify.

Personal life
Purcell, hailing from Hamilton, New Zealand, is the youngest of seven children to Ingrid and Brian Purcell. Two of her older sisters, Charmian and Natalie, have also represented the Tall Ferns and are both Olympians.

References

1995 births
Living people
BYU Cougars women's basketball players
Forwards (basketball)
Junior college women's basketball players in the United States
New Zealand expatriate basketball people in the United States
New Zealand expatriate basketball people in Australia
New Zealand women's basketball players
Basketball players at the 2018 Commonwealth Games
Commonwealth Games bronze medallists for New Zealand
Commonwealth Games medallists in basketball
People educated at John Paul College (Brisbane)
Medallists at the 2018 Commonwealth Games